Ali Rameez (22 August 1971) is  a Maldivian former singer.

Early life and career
Ali Rameez was born and raised in a family that included Rafiyath Rameeza and Ibrahim Rameez. He started singing cover songs at local resorts before singing in films and studio albums. Soon after, he became the most commercially successful and popular artists to have worked in the Maldivian music industry.

In 2002, Rameez announced that he would leave music temporarily. Three years later, he said that he had quit music and "regrets" his involvement in it.

Discography

Feature film

Short film

Television

Non-film songs

Religious / Madhaha

References 

Living people
21st-century imams
Quran reciters
21st-century Muslim scholars of Islam
1971 births
People from Malé
Maldivian playback singers